Pokharia is a village in West Champaran district in the Indian state of Bihar.

Demographics
As of 2011 India census, Pokharia had a population of 2796 in 488 households. Males constitute 51.3% of the population and females 48.6%. Pokharia has an average literacy rate of 44.5%, lower than the national average of 74%: male literacy is 60.2%, and female literacy is 39.7%. In Pokharia, 23.2% of the population is under 6 years of age.

References

Villages in West Champaran district